Wenming may refer to:

Murong Huang (297–348), or Prince Wenming, founding monarch of Former Yan
Wenming (684), the first era name of Emperor Ruizong of Tang when his mother ruled the empire

See also
Empress Wenming (disambiguation)